Yogesh Mahansaria is the founder and CEO of multinational Alliance Tire Group headquartered in India.

Early years
Yogesh was born in Mumbai India. He completed his graduation in B.Com. from Sydenham College, Mumbai.

Balkrishna Tyres
Yogesh joined his family business Balkrishna Tyres while he was still studying in 1993. On 8 July 2006 Yogesh along with his father Ashok Mahansaria exited from the family business of Balkrishna Tyres.

Alliance Tire group
In the year 2007 Yogesh and his father Ashok bought an Israeli tyre company Alliance Tire and started next leg of his own business. Yogesh set up manufacturing plant in Tirunelveli Tamil Nadu India and bought US company GPX under his Alliance Tire Group.

2014 
 EY Entrepreneur of the year - Manufacturing 2014

Interests
Yogesh enjoy reading and collecting cars, pens and watches

References

Living people
Businesspeople from Mumbai
Year of birth missing (living people)